Chapter Three refers to a third chapter, but the term may also refer to:

Albums
Chapter III (Agathodaimon album), 2003
Chapter III (Allure album), 2004
Chapter 3 (Queensberry album)
Chapter 3 (g.o.d album)
Chapter 3: The Flesh, a 2005 album by Syleena Johnson

Television
Chapter 3 (American Horror Story)
Chapter 3 (House of Cards)
 "Chapter 3: The Sin", an episode of the first season of The Mandalorian

Other uses
"Chapter III", a song from Revelations, a 1982 album by Killing Joke
Schism of the Three Chapters and Three-Chapter Controversy a sharp disagreement in sixth century Christianity